Catenae Innovation (formerly Milestone Group) is a British Digital Media and Technology company. Originally a cross media proprietor with holdings in radio, publishing and television, the company now focuses on the digital media and technology sector.

The company is based in London and is a constituent of the FTSE AIM All-Share Index division of the Alternative Investment Market.

History

Events 
Since Milestone’s admission to the AIM on 1 July 2003, the company has progressed from a radio, publishing and television provider to a digital media and technology company. The following events mark that progression:

2009 
Milestone entered into an agreement with privately owned American Technology firm, JumpStart Wireless Corporation, obtaining the rights to sell patented and patent pending technologies of Jumpstart in the UK.

2011 
Acquisition of Oil Productions Ltd and the development of OnSide.
Milestone’s subsidiary Oil Productions was awarded a contract to deliver a digital art competition for Infiniti.

2012 
Paul Elliott CBE was appointed Milestone’s Sports and Corporate Social Responsibility Ambassador, bringing his “expertise in community and corporate social responsibility, both locally and nationally” to the company.

2013 
Milestone launched its flagship product, the Passion Project, with the aim to inspire and empower young people and tackle youth unemployment.
Milestone piloted its Winning in the Game of Life™ product in Primary Schools, meeting the UK curriculum for Spiritual, Moral, Social and Cultural education, and developed the OnGuard product which went live with Charlton Athletic FC’s Community Trust.

2014 
Milestone’s subsidiary Oil Productions was awarded a contract to deliver the construction of a microsite for the Animals Asia Foundation.

2015 
Milestone formed a joint venture company, “Nexstar”, with Black Cactus Holdings Pty Ltd. Nexstar was originally launched for the loyalty and rewards sector, but has since expanded to include a range of services including music, film, TV and apps. It was agreed that Nexstar would syndicate content from Disorder Magazine.

Former holdings

Television channels 
The Milestone Group had one television channel Six TV (originally The Oxford Channel, it operated through Oxford Broadcasting) and was a "free-to-air" channel available in Oxford and Southampton.  It closed in 2009.

Newspapers & Magazines

Basingstoke Observer was sold in a management buyout in September 2006. Following several changes in ownership, it now operates under the ownership of Taylor Newspapers. In June 2015, the Observer brand was extended to publications in Newbury & Thatcham.

On November 28, 2019, Taylor Newspapers ceased operations.

References

Newspaper companies of the United Kingdom